The Hogs Back is a ridge in Herkimer County, New York in the Adirondack Mountains. It is located northwest of Stillwater in the Town of Webb. Alder Bed Mountain is located east-northeast of The Hogs Back.

References

Mountains of Herkimer County, New York
Mountains of New York (state)